BBC Bangla is the Bengali language service of the BBC World Service, inaugurated in 1941 for Bengali audiences worldwide, especially the ones in the Bengal region, which includes the sovereign state of Bangladesh and the Indian states of West Bengal and Tripura.

History
BBC Bangla was launched on 11 October 1941 with a 15-minute programme under the BBC World Service. BBC Bangla's headquarters used to be Bush House, but, since 2012, it has been broadcast from Broadcasting House in London as well as from BBC bureaux in Dhaka and Kolkata. In September 2022, BBC Bangla announced its cessation of radio broadcasts due to financial reasons.

On 31 December 2022, BBC Bangla officially ceased broadcasting on radio after eighty-one years of service, following the Parikrama program. Despite this, it continued its existence on television and the internet.

Broadcasting
The programmes of BBC Bangla are broadcast on FM radio, mediumwave and shortwave, their website and their internet radio and video services. BBC Bangla reaches 1,30,00,000 Bengali speaking people. Its radio and online services have listeners from many Bengali communities including those in Bangladesh, West Bengal, Tripura and Assam.

Programming
BBC Bangla mainly focuses on news-based daily programming and sports news. They also broadcast entertainment programmes, news analysis, and discussion about daily newspapers' lead stories. In addition they respond to and discuss messages and opinions from the audience.

Broadcasts on FM Radio

 Dhaka - FM 100
 Kolkata - FM 90.4
 Barisal - FM 105
 Comilla - FM 103.6
 Cox's Bazar - FM 100.8
 Thakurgaon - FM 92
 Chittagong - FM 88.8
 Rangpur - FM 88.8
 Rajshahi - FM 88.8
 Sylhet - FM 88.8
 Khulna - FM 88.8

Bangladesh Songlap
BBC Bangladesh Songlap (Bengali: বিবিসি বাংলাদেশ সংলাপ) was a live programme of the BBC Bangla service broadcast in association with Bangladeshi satellite channel Channel i from 2005 to 2015 in three seasons. The main focus of this programme was questions from the general public to relevant authorities about important issues.

See also

BBC Urdu
BBC Persian
BBC Hausa
BBC Somali

References

External links

Radio stations established in 1941
Bangla
British Bangladeshi mass media
British Indian mass media